The 2023 Ebonyi State gubernatorial election will take place on 18 March 2023, to elect the Governor of Ebonyi State, concurrent with elections to the Ebonyi State House of Assembly as well as twenty-seven other gubernatorial elections and elections to all other state houses of assembly. The election—which was postponed from its original 11 March date—will be held three weeks after the presidential election and National Assembly elections. Incumbent APC Governor Dave Umahi is term-limited and cannot seek re-election to a third term.

Party primaries were scheduled for between 4 April and 9 June 2022 with the All Progressives Grand Alliance nominating former Secretary to the State Government Bernard Odoh on 29 May while both the All Progressives Congress and the Peoples Democratic Party had two separate parallel primaries. For the APC, one primary nominated Speaker of the House of Assembly Francis Nwifuru on 26 May while another was won by former Revenue Mobilisation Allocation and Fiscal Commission chairman Elias Mbam on the same day; in the PDP, one primary nominated businessman Ifeanyi Odii on 30 May as a different primary nominated Senator for Ebonyi Central Joseph Ogba on 6 June. By July, INEC recognised Nwifuru as the APC nominee while the PDP nomination was awarded to Odii by the Supreme Court in September.

Electoral system
The Governor of Ebonyi State is elected using a modified two-round system. To be elected in the first round, a candidate must receive the plurality of the vote and over 25% of the vote in at least two-thirds of state local government areas. If no candidate passes this threshold, a second round will be held between the top candidate and the next candidate to have received a plurality of votes in the highest number of local government areas.

Background
Ebonyi State is a small, Igbo-majority southeastern state with a growing economy and vast natural areas but facing an underdeveloped yet vital agricultural sector, rising debt, and a low COVID-19 vaccination rate.

Politically, the state's 2019 elections were categorized as a continuation of the PDP's control as Umahi won with over 81% of the vote and the party won every seat in the House of Assembly along with all three senate seats. However, the PDP did lose one House of Representatives seat to the APC after a court ruling and although the state was easily won by PDP presidential nominee Atiku Abubakar, it still swung towards Buhari compared to 2015 and had lower turnout. In the interim between 2019 and 2023, the state's political landscape drastically changed as Umahi defecting to the APC in November 2020 set in motion a wave of other defections that gave the APC control of the House of Assembly. While the defections massively improved the APC's southeastern standing, the legal ramifications are still unknown as a high court briefly removed Umahi and all assemblymembers who also defected from office in March 2022 until the decision was overturned on appeal; it has been appealed further.

Ahead of his second term, Umahi stated focuses included agriculture, economic development, and resource development; however, he was criticized for authoritarian-esque actions. Alarms were raised after Umahi's defection when he ordered security forces to lock the state PDP secretariat in 2021 and when the state PDP spokesman was arrested for criticizing Umahi in 2022; he was also accused of using security forces to harass critics and political opponents. At other points during his administration, Umahi was given praise for economic diversification and increasing government transparency while receiving further criticism for blaming IPOB attacks on politicians without evidence and ranting against the judiciary.

Primary elections
The primaries, along with any potential challenges to primary results, were to take place between 4 April and 3 June 2022 but the deadline was extended to 9 June. An informal zoning gentlemen's agreement sets the Ebonyi North Senatorial District to have the next governor as Ebonyi North has not held the governorship since 2007. However, some groups such as the Association of Ebonyi State Indigenes in the Diaspora claimed that as one full rotation of districts would be complete in 2023, further zoning was unnecessary. On the other hand, some leaders in the Izzi subgroup of the Igbo people claim that not only should the governorship be zoned to Ebonyi North, it should go to the Izzi as former Governor Sam Egwu was from a non-Izzi area of Ebonyi North. Meanwhile, some leaders in the Ezaa subgroup of the Igbo people called for their group to hold the governorship as the Ezaa are one of the largest subgroups in the state.

Eventually, the PDP settled on zoning to the "Abakaliki bloc" (the North and Central Senatorial Districts) while APGA and the APC declined to formally zone their nominations.

All Progressives Congress 
Ahead of the primary, the state APC constituted a zoning committee that submitted its report in April 2022; along with the zoning committee, Umahi also asked leaders from both the Ezaa and Izzi subethnic groups to put forward candidates. While Ezaa APC leaders settled on former Senator Julius Ucha at a meeting in Onueke, the Izzi process was much more contentious as Izzi stakeholders were reportedly divided between backing RMFAC Chairman Elias Mbam or Assembly Speaker Francis Ogbonna Nwifuru. After Mbam eventually won out, Nwifuru supporters rushed to endorse him anyway while other Izzi leaders chastised the supportive statement.

Another cause of intraparty strife were rumours that Umahi was personally supporting Nwifuru. This speculation was confirmed on 23 April 2022 when Umahi endorsed Nwifuru while at a funeral. Ucha and other candidates derided Umahi's endorsement of Nwifuru as 'undemocratic imposition' that was characteristic of his "high-handed" party leadership style. In response, an Umahi aide claimed the endorsement was based on the wide support Nwifuru received from stakeholders and that Umahi's would not prevent internal democracy during the primary.

On the primary date, two separate factional primaries were held with the grouping backed by Umahi and the state party holding an indirect primary at the Pa Ngele Oruta Township Stadium while the faction supported by Mbam held an indirect primary at Mbam's campaign office. After both primaries were peacefully held, the Stadium primary ended in Nwifuru winning by a wide margin while the Mbam factional primary resulted in his victory. Nwifuru was recognized as the legitimate nominee in July by INEC.

Nominated 
 Francis Nwifuru: House of Assembly member for Izzi West (2011–present) and Speaker of the House of Assembly (2015–present)
Running mate—Patricia Obila: Afikpo North Local Government Vice Chairman

Eliminated in primary 
 Elias Mbam: Chairman of the Revenue Mobilization Allocation and Fiscal Commission (2010–2015; 2019–2022) and former commissioner (1999–2005)
 Edward Nkwegu: Chairman of Ebonyi State Extended Special Public Works Programme of the Federal Government, 2019 APC gubernatorial candidate, and 2015 LP gubernatorial nominee (defected after the primary to the LP)
 Rosemary Ofoke Nwogbaga
 Julius Ucha: member of the National Assembly Service Commission (2020–present), 2015 APC gubernatorial nominee, 2011 ACN gubernatorial nominee, former Senator for Ebonyi Central (2003–2011), former House of Assembly member, and former Speaker of the House of Assembly

Withdrew 
 Nnanna Igwe: medical doctor

Declined  
 Augustine Nwankwegu: former state Attorney General (2015–2017), former House of Assembly member for Izzi West, and former Speaker of the House of Assembly
 Godwin Ogbaga: former acting Secretary to the State Government and former Minister of State for Power and Steel (1998–1999)
 Sonni Ogbuoji: former Senator for Ebonyi South (2011–2019), 2019 APC gubernatorial nominee, former Commissioner for Economic Empowerment and Poverty Reduction (2009–2010), and former Afikpo South Local Government Chairman
 Kenneth Ugbala: Secretary to the State Government (2019–2022)

Results

All Progressives Grand Alliance
In early April 2022, state APGA Chairman Ricky Okorouka announced that the state party would not zone its gubernatorial nomination.

On 25 March 2022, the national APGA announced its primary schedule, setting its expression of interest form price at ₦3 million and the nomination form price at ₦12 million with a 50% discount for women candidates and candidates with disabilities. Forms are to be sold from 29 March to 11 April; after the purchase of forms, gubernatorial candidates are to be screened by a party committee on 22 and 23 April while the screening appeal process is slated for 5 May. Ward congresses are set for 10 May to elect delegates for the primary. Candidates approved by the screening process advanced to a primary set for 29 May, in concurrence with all other APGA gubernatorial primaries; challenges to the result could be made on 31 May.

On the primary date, former Secretary to the State Government Bernard Odoh was the sole candidate and won the nomination unopposed. In his acceptance speech, Odoh derided the APC and PDP along with pledging to lead APGA to victory.

Nominated   
 Bernard Odoh: 2019 APC gubernatorial candidate and former Secretary to the State Government (2015–2018)
Running mate—Nkata Chuku

Results

People's Democratic Party 
In late September 2021, State PDP Chairman Fred Udeogu announced that the state party had zoned its gubernatorial nomination to the "Abakaliki bloc" (the North and Central Senatorial Districts).

On the primary date, the national PDP abruptly cancelled the gubernatorial primary along with all other Ebonyi PDP primaries due to court ruling over state party leadership. Before the national leadership set a new primary date, a party faction led by ousted state chairman Silas Onu held its own election, nominating businessman Ifeanyi Chukwuma Odii by a wide margin. The national party and its recognized state chairman, Tochukwu Okorie, rejected the primary and held their own primary on 6 June; it was won by Senator Joseph Ogba. However, the next day, a Federal High Court annulled the Okorie factional primary and declared the Odii-won primary as legitimate. The court battle continued afterwards until 14 September when the Supreme Court ruled in favor of Odii and declared him the legitimate nominee. INEC briefly removed Odii as recognized nominee in December 2022 due to renewed litigation but he was returned to the list of candidates by late January.

Nominated 
 Ifeanyi Chukwuma Odii: businessman

Eliminated in primary 
 Edwin Anayo: House of Representatives member for Ezza North/Ishielu (2015–present)
 Emmanuel Ezeh: President of Ebonyi Chambers of Commerce, Industry, Mines and Agriculture
 Austin Igwe-Edeze
 Paulinus Igwe Nwagu: former Senator for Ebonyi Central (2011–2015), former House of Representatives member for Ezza North/Ishielu (2007–2011), and former Ezza North Local Government Chairman (1999–2002)
 Fidelis Nwankwo: former Minister of State for Health and former Izzi Local Government Chairman
 Augustine Nwazunku: former Secretary of the Ebonyi State Agency for Control of AIDS and brother of opponent Chukwuma Nwazunku
 Chukwuma Nwazunku: House of Representatives member for Abakaliki/Izzi (2015–present), former House of Assembly member, former Speaker of the House of Assembly, and brother of opponent Augustine Nwazunku
 Adaeze Nwuzor: former Ebonyi Local Government Chairman
 Joseph Ogba: Senator for Ebonyi Central (2015–present), former Commissioner for Youths and Sports (2002–2003), and former Ishielu Local Government Chairman
Running mate—Oliver Osi: House of Assembly member for Ivo
 Sylvester Ogbaga: House of Representatives member for Abakaliki/Izzi (2007–present) and former Abakaliki Local Government Chairman
 Chris Usulor: House of Assembly member for Ezza South (2011–present) and son of former Ebonyi Central Senator Vincent Obasi Usulor

Declined 
 Chukwuma Nwandiugo: former Commissioner for Works and Transport

Results

Minor parties 

 Chukwuma Awuregu Nwandugo (Action Alliance)
Running mate: Cordelia Chiaka Ugboaja
 Kenneth Nwabueze Oziomaeze (Action Democratic Party)
Running mate: Ogochukwu Jonah Okorie
 Apollos Ndubisi Okpara (Action Peoples Party)
Running mate: Elijah Umoke
 Bernard Nyaba Nwonomara (African Democratic Congress)
Running mate: Solomon Ogbonna Okoh
 Chinenye Judith Igwe (Allied Peoples Movement)
Running mate: Kingsley Chukwuma Aliede
 Edward Nkwegu (Labour Party)
Running mate: Ajah Nwabueze Igwe
 Chris Soni Adol-Awam (New Nigeria Peoples Party)
Running mate: Nkechinyere B. Okochi
 Anthony N. Usulor (National Rescue Movement)
Running mate: Evo Christopher Ogbonnaya
 Micheal Ikechukwu Nwankwo (Social Democratic Party)
Running mate: Iheanacho Nwugo
 Sunday Andrew Opoke (Young Progressives Party)
Running mate: Sunday Ogbonnaya Okoro

Campaign
Much of the general election campaign was dominated by internal party disputes that often led to extensive legal battles. The nominations of both Nwifuru and Odii were challenged by the winners of their parties' parallel primaries with the PDP case rising to the Supreme Court. For the state PDP, the court cases were only a part of its wider internal crisis. By 2023, attention mainly switched to the presidential election on 25 February. In the election, Ebonyi State voted for Peter Obi (LP); Obi won the state with 79.8% of the vote, beating Bola Tinubu (APC) at 13.0% and Atiku Abubakar (PDP) at 4.2%. Although the result was unsurprising—Ebonyi is in Obi's southeastern stronghold and projections had favored him—the result led to increased attention on the chances of LP gubernatorial nominee Edward Nkwegu as opposed to Nwifuru, Odoh, or Odii. However, the LP nomination itself was embroiled in legal action which culminated in the removal of Nkwegu as nominee. In the wake of the presidential election and the court ruling sacking Nkwegu, analysts focused on various factors including regional strength by candidate, internal party relations, and zoning dynamics.

Projections

Conduct

Electoral timetable

General election

Results

By senatorial district 
The results of the election by senatorial district.

By federal constituency
The results of the election by federal constituency.

By local government area 
The results of the election by local government area.

See also 
 2023 Nigerian elections
 2023 Nigerian gubernatorial elections

Notes

References 

Ebonyi State gubernatorial election
2023
2023 Ebonyi State elections
Ebonyi